Mike Fenner (born 24 April 1971 in East Berlin) is a retired German hurdler.

His personal best is 13.06 seconds, achieved in June 1995 in Scheeßel. This ranks him second among German 110 m hurdlers, only behind Florian Schwarthoff.

Competition record

References

1971 births
Living people
German male hurdlers
Athletes (track and field) at the 2004 Summer Olympics
Olympic athletes of Germany
Athletes from Berlin
East German male hurdlers
People from East Berlin